Borodino Hall, also known as Borodino Grange Hall, is a building in the hamlet of Borodino, New York.  It was listed on the National Register of Historic Places in 2006. Borodino Hall was built in 1835 by the First Religious Society of Borodino, and served as a church until 1868.  It is a two-story building with a gabled roof on a high stone basement.  It is of heavy timber-frame construction designed in the Federal style.  The building was sold in 1868, and a stage was added to the interior around that time, converting it into a hall.  In 1871, a performance of "Uncle Tom’s Cabin" was presented there by the Borodino Dramatic Society.  At some time after this, the building became the Spafford Town Hall, a purpose it served until 1912.  In that year the Grange chapter #1272 began meeting in the Hall, and they purchased it in 1919.  Water service, a kitchen and restrooms were added in the early 1950s.  The Spafford Area Historical Society purchased the building in 1997.  It currently serves as a community center.

References

External links

Grange buildings on the National Register of Historic Places in New York (state)
Buildings and structures in Onondaga County, New York
Federal architecture in New York (state)
Churches completed in 1835
19th-century churches in the United States
National Register of Historic Places in Onondaga County, New York